Łukasz Kubot and Oliver Marach were the defending champions. They reached the final, but lost to Marcelo Melo and Bruno Soares, 6–3, 7–6(3).

Seeds

  Łukasz Kubot /  Oliver Marach (final)
  Eduardo Schwank /  Horacio Zeballos (semifinals)
  Marcelo Melo /  Bruno Soares (champions)
  Juan Ignacio Chela /  Santiago González (semifinals)

Draw

Draw

External links
 Main Draw

Movistar Open - Doubles
2011 Doubles